Malcolm Boyd (6 September 1896 – 11 May 1960) was an Australian middle-distance runner. He competed in the men's 800 metres at the 1924 Summer Olympics.

References

External links
 

1896 births
1960 deaths
Athletes (track and field) at the 1924 Summer Olympics
Australian male middle-distance runners
Olympic athletes of Australia
Place of birth missing